Marjorie Marvell (born 7 July 1938) is an Australian former cricketer.  Marvell played five Test matches for the Australia national women's cricket team.

References

1938 births
Australia women Test cricketers
Cricketers from Sydney
Living people
Sportswomen from New South Wales